Rogener Pavinski (born 1981 in Ribeirão Preto, Brazil) is a Brazilian Esperantist, singer and bass guitar player in the Esperanto rock band Supernova, which has performed at Esperanto world congresses and youth events. He is also director and producer of the film Esperanto is... (in Esperanto "Esperanto estas...").

He is a former board member (2007–2009) of World Esperanto Youth Organization. In September 2010 he was elected as new editor of the magazine Kontakto, effective with the 2010-05 issue.

Notes

External links
 Rogener Pavinski Pavinski's ipernity site

1981 births
Living people
World Esperanto Youth Organization directors
Esperanto-language singers
Brazilian Esperantists